Roman Horák (born May 21, 1991) is a Czech ice hockey player currently playing for HC Sparta Praha of the Czech Extraliga (ELH). He previously played nine games in the Czech Extraliga with HC České Budějovice before coming to North America to play two WHL seasons with the Chilliwack Bruins. He was selected by the New York Rangers in the fifth round, 127th overall, of the 2009 NHL Entry Draft, and joined the Calgary Flames organization via trade in 2011. In 2014, he was traded by the Flames for a brief stint with the Edmonton Oilers.

Playing career
Horák began his professional career with his hometown team HC České Budějovice of the Czech Extraliga, appearing in one game with the club in 2007–08 and eight more in 2008–09.  He was selected by the New York Rangers in the fifth round, 127th overall, at the 2009 NHL Entry Draft. Additionally, Horák was selected by the Western Hockey League's (WHL) Chilliwack Bruins with the eighth overall pick in the Canadian Hockey League (CHL) import draft. Though he had little knowledge of English, Horák moved to Canada to join the Bruins for the 2009–10 WHL season.

In his first season in Chilliwack, Horák scored 21 goals and 47 points. He improved to 26 goals and 78 points in 2010–11. Additionally, he represented the Czech Republic at the 2010 World Junior Ice Hockey Championships, where he had one goal and one assist in six games. He returned to the team for the 2011 tournament, recording one assist in five games in that tournament.

Horák signed a contract with the New York Rangers on May 6, 2011. However, before he played a game with the NHL team, he was traded to the Calgary Flames on June 1, along with two draft picks, in exchange for defenceman Tim Erixon. The Flames discovered Horák while scouting his teammate, and their own draft pick, Ryan Howse. The team realized that Howse, a 50-goal scorer in 2010–11, had become far less effective when Horák suffered an injury.

Initially expected to join the Flames' minor league affiliate, the Abbotsford Heat of the American Hockey League (AHL), to begin the 2011–12 season, Horák exceeded the team's expectations and earned a spot with the Flames. He made his NHL debut and scored his first point, an assist, against the Pittsburgh Penguins on October 8, 2011. He scored his first NHL goal on October 26 against Jean-Sébastien Giguère of the Colorado Avalanche.

On November 8, 2013, Horák was traded to the Edmonton Oilers alongside goaltender prospect Laurent Brossoit in exchange for Ladislav Šmíd and minor league goalie Olivier Roy. He was subsequently reassigned by the Oilers to their AHL affiliate, the Oklahoma City Barons.

With his NHL rights still owned by the Oilers, Horák opted to return to Europe in signing a one-year contract with Russian club Vityaz Podolsk of the Kontinental Hockey League (KHL) on May 12, 2014.

Horák played two seasons in the Swedish Hockey League with the Växjö Lakers before opting to return to his native Czech Republic as a free agent. On 13 May 2020, he secured a one-year contract with HC Sparta Praha of the ELH, in which he had not played since the 2008–09 season.

Personal life
His father, Roman Horák, also played hockey in European elite leagues for 14 seasons.

Career statistics

Regular season and playoffs

International

References

External links

1991 births
Abbotsford Heat players
Calgary Flames players
Chilliwack Bruins players
Czech ice hockey centres
Edmonton Oilers players
Motor České Budějovice players
Living people
New York Rangers draft picks
Oklahoma City Barons players
Ice hockey players at the 2018 Winter Olympics
Olympic ice hockey players of the Czech Republic
HC Sparta Praha players
Sportspeople from České Budějovice
Växjö Lakers players
HC Vityaz players
Czech expatriate ice hockey players in Canada
Czech expatriate ice hockey players in the United States
Czech expatriate ice hockey players in Russia
Czech expatriate ice hockey players in Sweden